22000 may refer to:
 The last year in the 22nd millennium
 IE 22000 Class, a class of diesel trains in Ireland
 ISO 22000, an international food safety standard